Sean Henry may refer to:

 Sean Henry (administrator) (born 1968), ice hockey administrator
 Sean Henry (artist) (born 1965), sculptor
Sean Henry (musician), American musician
 Seán Henry (rugby union) (born 1987), rugby union player